The 1985–86 Nationalliga A season was the 48th season of the Nationalliga A, the top level of ice hockey in Switzerland. 10 teams participated in the league, and HC Lugano won the championship.

Regular season

Playoffs

Semifinals 

 HC Lugano – HC Sierre 7:2 7:3
 HC Davos – EHC Kloten 4:2, 5:8, 8:1

3rd place 
 EHC Kloten – HC Sierre 9:1, 4:4

Finale 

 HC Lugano – HC Davos 5:0 (0:0,2:0,3:0)
 HC Davos – HC Lugano 5:7

External links
 Championnat de Suisse 1985/86

National League (ice hockey) seasons
Swiss
1985–86 in Swiss ice hockey